The 1984 Delaware gubernatorial election took place on November 6, 1984. Incumbent Republican Governor Pierre S. duPont IV was barred from seeking a third term in office. Lieutenant Governor Mike Castle was elected to succeed him, defeating State Supreme Court Justice William T. Quillen.

Election results

References

See also

Delaware
1984
Gubernatorial